Nigel Gareth Davies (born 29 March 1965) is a former Wales international rugby union player, who played his club rugby at Llanelli RFC. His son Sam Davies is a professional rugby union player.

Davies was born in Waun y Clun, Trimsaran and as a youth player played for local rugby union club Trimsaran RFC. In his final year of playing for the youth team he was invited by Llanelli RFC to play for them in a friendly match, from which he impressed enough to be selected by the club. Davies played 498 games for Llanelli including nine WRU Challenge Cup finals.

Davies was appointed assistant coach to the Wales national team under Gareth Jenkins and was appointed caretaker Head Coach following the departure of Jenkins after the 2007 Rugby World Cup. In May 2008 Davies was announced as the head coach of the Scarlets, replacing Phil Davies who moved to the Scarlets board of directors.

In June 2012 Davies joined Gloucester as Director of Rugby. After a poor season in 2013–14, Davies was sacked by Gloucester.

In June 2015 Davies was announced as Ebbw Vale RFC Head Coach

References

External links
Wales profile

1965 births
Living people
Llanelli RFC players
Rugby union players from Trimsaran
Scarlets coaches
Wales international rugby union players
Wales national rugby union team coaches
Wales rugby union captains
Welsh rugby union coaches
Welsh rugby union players